Samir Banerjee was the defending champion, but is no longer eligible to participate in junior events.

Mili Poljičak won the title, defeating Michael Zheng in the final, 7–6(7–2), 7–6(7–3).

Seeds

Draw

Finals

Top half

Section 1

Section 2

Bottom half

Section 3

Section 4

Qualifying

Seeds

Qualifiers

Draw

First qualifier

Second qualifier

Third qualifier

Fourth qualifier

Fifth qualifier

Sixth qualifier

Seventh qualifier

Eighth qualifier

References

External links

Draws

Boys' Singles
Wimbledon Championship by year – Boys' singles